Beijing Municipal No. 1 Prison or No. 1 Detention Center is a prison in eastern Beijing, China, in proximity to Beijing Capital International Airport.

See also
List of prisons in Beijing

References

Sources
Laogai Research Foundation Handbook

Prisons in Beijing